Steve Eminger (born October 31, 1983) is a Canadian former professional ice hockey defenceman who played in the National Hockey League (NHL).

Playing career
Eminger, who is also known for his physical play, started his hockey career with the Kitchener Rangers of the Ontario Hockey League in 1999. He was drafted in the first round, 12th overall by the Washington Capitals at the 2002 NHL Entry Draft. He made his NHL debut the next season, but after 17 games in Washington he was sent back down to Kitchener. Kitchener was strengthened by Eminger's return, and they won the Memorial Cup.

Since leaving junior hockey, Eminger split his time between the Capitals and their AHL affiliate, the Portland Pirates. Despite the lofty projections that came with his first-round-pick status, Eminger has failed to live up to expectations. Throughout the 2007–08 NHL season, the final season of his contract, Eminger spent a great deal of time as a healthy scratch. However, during the 2008 playoffs the Capitals were decimated by injuries and Eminger was put into the lineup with a larger role. During these playoffs, Eminger suddenly found his niche and proved himself to be a solid defenceman. During the 2008 NHL Entry Draft, Eminger, along with the 84th overall pick (Jacob De Serres) were traded to the Philadelphia Flyers for the 27th pick overall (John Carlson).

On June 29, 2008, Eminger and the Flyers agreed to a one-year contract. After 12 games with the Flyers, Eminger was traded to Tampa Bay on November 7, 2008, along with Steve Downie and a 4th round draft pick for Matt Carle and a 3rd round draft pick.

On March 9, 2009, on the day of the trade deadline, Tampa Bay traded Eminger to the Florida Panthers in exchange for Noah Welch and a 3rd round draft pick.

On September 4, 2009, Eminger was signed as a free agent by the Anaheim Ducks to a two-year deal.

On July 9, 2010, Eminger was traded to New York Rangers for Aaron Voros and Ryan Hillier. On September 10, 2012, Eminger agreed to a new contract to re-sign with the Rangers.

After spending his professional career entirely on North America soil, Eminger signed as a free agent to his first contract abroad with Russian club, CSKA Moscow of the Kontinental Hockey League on October 21, 2014. After producing just 2 assists in 25 games, Eminger was released from his KHL contract and on January 24, 2014, Eminger joined the Norfolk Admirals after having cleared AHL wavers.

On September 5, 2014, the Boston Bruins announced that Eminger had signed a one-year contract with their AHL affiliate, the Providence Bruins. As a free agent in the summer and into the midpoint of the 2015-16 season, Eminger returned to play in signing a professional try-out contract with the Lake Erie Monsters of the AHL on January 21, 2016. Eminger ended his playing career after winning the Calder Cup with the Monsters during the 2015–16 season.

On June 14, 2017, Eminger was announced to have accepted a position as a professional scout for the New York Rangers.

Personal life
Eminger is married to Lindsay Eminger.

Career statistics

Regular season and playoffs

International

Awards and honors

References

External links
 

1983 births
Living people
Anaheim Ducks players
Canadian expatriate ice hockey players in Russia
Canadian ice hockey defencemen
Canadian people of German descent
Connecticut Whale (AHL) players
Florida Panthers players
HC CSKA Moscow players
Ice hockey people from Ontario
Kitchener Rangers players
Lake Erie Monsters players
National Hockey League first-round draft picks
New York Rangers players
New York Rangers scouts
Norfolk Admirals players
People from Vaughan
Philadelphia Flyers players
Portland Pirates players
Providence Bruins players
Tampa Bay Lightning players
Washington Capitals draft picks
Washington Capitals players